The Bellview School near Pikeville, Tennessee is a rural schoolhouse built in 1928, later used as a community center.  It was listed on the National Register of Historic Places in 1999.

It was built as a one-room schoolhouse but was meant to be ready for partitioning.  It was split into two rooms in 1941 and was used as a school until 1964.

It is a T-shaped building upon a stuccoed brick foundation.  It has a painted corrugated metal cross-gable roof and board and batten siding.

References

Schools in Tennessee
National Register of Historic Places in Bledsoe County, Tennessee
School buildings completed in 1928
1928 establishments in Tennessee